Kiçik Dəhnə (also, Kichik-Dakhna and Kichik-Dekhna) is a village and the most populous municipality in the Shaki Rayon of Azerbaijan.

References 

Populated places in Shaki District